Marco Antonio Loughran (born 24 March 1989) is an English-born British competitive swimmer who has represented Great Britain at the Olympics and FINA world championships, European Championships and Wales in the Commonwealth Games. He has also competed under Team Europe at Duel in the Pool 2011.

Loughran is from Tolworth, a town in Surrey, England.  In high school, he was awarded a swimming scholarship to The Southport School in Queensland, Australia.  While there, Marco was known as one of the "offshore boys".  He then accepted a full athletic scholarship to attend the University of Florida in Gainesville, Florida, where he trained and competed with coach Gregg Troy's Florida Gators swimming and diving team in National Collegiate Athletic Association (NCAA) and Southeastern Conference (SEC) competition in 2009 and 2010.  In two American college swimming seasons, he received three All-American honours. Winning 4 golds (200yard backstroke 2009 as a freshman, 100/200 backstroke and 4x50 Medley relay 2010) at SEC’s clean sweeping the Men’s backstroke category. In both of years Marco swam at UF, he recorded the fastest Men’s 200 yard backstroke in the NCAA prior to the March finals.

In 2008 Loughran recorded a Top-10 European ranking in the Men’s 200 m Backstroke and at the time of competition was ranked 9th globally. He qualified for both the Men’s 100/200m backstroke at the 2008 Beijing Olympic Games. Loughran competed in the 2009 World Aquatics Championships in Rome, Italy. He raced in the 50, 100 and 200 backstroke events. 2010 swam for Wales at the 2010 Commonwealth Games held in Delhi, India. He came 4th (100m backstroke) 5th (50m backstroke) 6th (200m backstroke). In 2012 he competed for Team GB at the 2012 Olympic Games in London.  He swam in the men's 200m backstroke and finished 18th, missing the semi-finals.  He was the highest placing Team GB male athlete in this event.

In 2013 he won the men's 50-metre backstroke at the British Championships, held in Sheffield.  He competed again for Wales at the 2014 Commonwealth Games.

In June 2015, Loughran and his girlfriend Jeanette Ottesen were attacked in a road rage incident in Copenhagen, during which he sustained several injuries.
In 2016, he and Jeanette wed at a private ceremony in Copenhagen and welcomed their baby daughter Billie-Mai in December 2017.

Personal life
He has been in a relationship with Danish swimmer Jeanette Ottesen since 2014. Loughran and Ottesen got engaged in early 2017. In June 2017, they announced that they are expecting their first child. They were married in Copenhagen on July 16, 2017. In December, 2017 Ottesen gave birth to a girl.
Loughran's father hails from Caerleon, Wales whilst his mother is from Venezuela

References

External links
 British Swimming athlete profile

1989 births
Living people
English male swimmers
Welsh male swimmers
Florida Gators men's swimmers
Male backstroke swimmers
Olympic swimmers of Great Britain
Sportspeople from Guildford
Swimmers at the 2012 Summer Olympics
Swimmers at the 2010 Commonwealth Games
Swimmers at the 2014 Commonwealth Games
Commonwealth Games competitors for Wales